Bykovsky District is an administrative district (raion), one of the thirty-three in Volgograd Oblast, Russia. As a municipal division, it is incorporated as Bykovsky Municipal District. It is located in the east of the oblast. Its administrative center is the urban locality (a work settlement) of Bykovo. Population:  28,572 (2002 Census);  The population of Bykovo accounts for 28.5% of the district's total population.

References

Notes

Sources

Districts of Volgograd Oblast